Ashikaga Ujihime (足利 氏姫, 1574 – June 6, 1620), or Ashikaga no Ujihime, Ashikaga Ujinohime was the de facto Koga kubō in Sengoku period. She was the daughter of 5th Koga kubō Ashikaga Yoshiuji and Jōkō-in (a daughter of Hōjō Ujiyasu). She was a woman trained in martial arts and received education from the highest court. In 1583 when Yoshiuji died without a male heir, Ujihime succeeded her father at the young age of nine, she took the title Koga kubō (title equivalent to shōgun in Kantō region) and inherited an area equivalent the Koga domain.

Life 
She was de facto the Koga Kubo and the castellan in Koga Castle. Even the Ashikaga shogunate lost its sovereignty, Ujinohime was vital to the administration of the Kantō region, she worked together with the  Later Hōjō clan and had her lands protected by her uncle Hōjō Ujimasa.

In 1590, Toyotomi Hideyoshi initiated a campaign to eliminate the Hōjō clan, the last obstacle for Japan to be unified under the name of Hideyoshi. The Toyotomi clan wins in the siege of Odawara and the Hōjō clan has been banished, Ujimasa is ordered to commit seppuku along with his brother Hōjō Ujiteru. The area was awarded to Tokugawa Ieyasu after the defeat of the Hōjō at the siege of Odawara.

In 1591 Toyotomi Hideyoshi ordered her married to Ashikaga Kunitomo. When Kunitomo died in 1593, she was then married to his younger brother Ashikaga Yoriuji (Later known as Kitsuregawa Yoriuji) and give birth to a son. The marriage between Ujinohime and Yoriuji began the formation of a new clan, the Kitsuregawa clan. Yoriuji received a new domain, but Ujinohime declined to change domain. So she continued commanding the Konosu palace and Yoriuji went to another castle.

She and Yoriuji ran the Kitsuregawa clan until the day of her death on June 6, 1620. The clan Ujinohime founded prospered for years and became a fudai daimyo in the Edo period.

See also 

 List of female castellans in Japan

References

People of Sengoku-period Japan
Women of medieval Japan
1574 births
1620 deaths
Samurai
Government of feudal Japan
Kantō kubō
Ujinohime
16th-century Japanese people
16th-century Japanese women
17th-century Japanese women
16th-century women rulers
17th-century women rulers
16th-century women politicians
17th-century women politicians
People of Edo-period Japan